Nocturnal Emissions is Nigel Ayers's sound art project that has released numerous records and CDs in music styles ranging from electro-acoustic, musique concrète, hybridised beats, sound collage, post-industrial music, ambient and noise music.
Their sound art has been part of an ongoing multimedia campaign of guerrilla sign ontology utilizing video art, film, hypertext and other media, particularly collage. Nocturnal Emissions were depicted by the novelist Stewart Home.

History
The project was initiated in Derbyshire in the late 1970s by Nigel Ayers (b. 1957), a former art student who, during the period, lived in London, together with collaborators Danny Ayers (b. 1964) and Caroline K (1957–2008). Since 1984 Nocturnal Emissions has continued mainly as Nigel Ayers' solo project.

Record label
Nocturnal Emissions has run their own record label called Sterile Records. In 1990–92 Nocturnal Emissions collaborated on Butoh dance performances in Europe and the United States, with the Japanese choreographer Poppo Shiraishi. Around this time Nocturnal Emissions' Situationist-influenced practice became increasingly informed by magick, stone circles, techno–shamanism, neo-paganism, animism and Fortean research. There were many collaborations on animated films by Mancunian TV director Charlotte Bill. Bill was never an official member of Nocturnal Emissions but admits to being one of the legion of members of The Fall

Association of Autonomous Astronauts
Nocturnal Emissions were later to be associated with the Kernow section of the Association of Autonomous Astronauts

Partial discography
 Tissue of Lies LP (Emiss, 1981)
 Tissue of Lies Revised CD (Dark Vinyl, 1990)
 Fruiting Body LP(Sterile, 1981)
 Drowning in a Sea of Bliss LP (Sterile, 1983; cassette reissued by Touch, 1985;  CD reissued by Soleilmoon, 1993)
 Viral Shedding LP (Illuminated, 1983)
 Befehlsnotstand LP (Sterile, 1983)
 Chaos (Live at the Ritzy) LP (Cause For Concern,  1983)
 Dyskinesia (Sterile, 1983)
 The Fight Goes On cassette (Staalplaat, 1984)
 No Sacrifice 12" (Sterile, 1984)
 Shake Those Chains Rattle Those Cages LP (Sterile, 1985)
 Songs of Love and Revolution LP (Sterile, 1985; CD re-issue from Dark Vinyl, 1992)
 The World is my Womb LP (Earthly Delights, 1987; Soleilmoon cassette, 1989; Soleilmoon CD, 1999)
 Duty Experiment 1982–1984 LP (Earthly Delights, 1988; CD reissue Soleilmoon, 1995)
 Spiritflesh LP (Earthly Delights, 1988; Soleilmoon cassette, 1989)
 Stoneface LP (Parade Amoureuse, 1989; CD reissue from Staalplaat, 1994 with Spiritflesh)
 Da Dum 7" (Parade Amoureuse, 1989)
 Invocation of the Beast Gods CD (Staalplaat, 1989)
 Beyond Logic, Beyond Belief LP (Earthly Delights, 1989)
 Mouth of Babes LP (Earthly Delights, 1990; CD reissue from Soleilmoon, 1991)
 Energy Exchange LP (Earthly Delights, 1991)
 Cathedral CD (Musica Maxima Magnetica, 1991)
 Blasphemous Rumours CD(Staalplaat, 1992)
 The Seminal Works –12 tape box set (Earthly Delights, 1992)
 Magnetized Light CD (Musica Maxima Magnetica, 1993)
 The Quickening LP (Earthly Delights, 1993)
 Glossalalia CD (Soleilmoon, 1994)
 Holy of Holies – 4-hour DAT (Soleilmoon, 1994)
 Binary Tribe CD (Staalplaat, 1994)
 Imaginary Time LP(Soleilmoon, 1995)
 Autonomia CD (Soleilmoon, 1996)
 Friction And Dirt CD (Staalplaat, 1996)
 Tharmuncrape An'goo CD (Soleilmoon, 1997)
 Sunspot Activities CD (Soleilmoon, 1997)
 Omphalos CD (Soleilmoon, 1998
 Futurist Antiquarianism CD (Soleilmoon, 2000)
 Collateral Salvage CD (Soleilmoon, 2003)
 Nightscapes LP (Small Voices, 2006)

Collaborations
 The Beauty of Pollution (with C.C.C.C.) (Endorphine Factory, 1996)
 From Solstice to Equinox (with Barnacles) (Klanggalerie, 2023)

Side projects
Oedipus Brain Foil 3xCD (with Randy Greif and Robin Storey) (Soleilmoon, 1998)

Mesmeric Enabling Device CD (with John S. Everall and Mick Harris) (Soleilmoon, 1999)

The World Turned Gingham CD (with Robin Story, released under the name Hank & Slim) (Caciocavallo, 2000)

Transgenic CD (Solo album released under the name Transgenic) (Soleilmoon, 2000)

Selected Video works
Bleeding Images (1982)

The Foetal Grave of Progress (1983)

Soundtracks
The Three Trials – Adventures in Psychotica (Randy Greif dir.)
www.thethreetrials.com

Books
 ELECTRONIC RESISTANCE, Nigel Ayers, Amaya Publishing (Oakland, CA)

See also
 Scratch Video

References

 1991 EST interview - retrieved 19 September 2015
 2011 Brainwashed interview - retrieved 19 September 2015
 2015 Quietus interview - retrieved 18 September 2015
S. Alexander Reed    Assimilate: A Critical History of Industrial Music  Oxford University Press USA (2013)  

Online references:

 Concrete Shelves interview - retrieved 28 July 2020
 For All and None - retrieved 28 July 2020
 Sounddrift - retrieved 28 July 2020
 Sounds magazine - retrieved 28 July 2020
 Art Cornwall- retrieved 28 July 2020
 Forced Exposure - retrieved 28 July 2020
 Industrial Music history - Record Collector magazine - retrieved 10 August 2020
 The Attic Mag - retrieved 28 July 2020
 Beyond Logic Beyond Belief - retrieved 28 July 2020
  Assimilate interview -retrieved 28 July 2020
 tape-mag archive retrieved 5 August 2020

External links
 The project's web site
 Extended discography
 Nigel Ayers web site
 1982YouTube clip
 Nocturnal Emissions at MySpace
 Nocturnal Emissions at iTunes
 "Electronic Resistance" book of artwork by Nigel Ayers 1980-1992

British industrial music groups
Soleilmoon artists
Musical groups established in 1980
British experimental musical groups
Noise musical groups
Cassette culture 1970s–1990s